Vasip Şahin (born 1964) is a Turkish civil servant. Currently, he serves as the Governor of Ankara Province.

Life 
He was born in Bayburt in 1964. He completed his primary, secondary and high school education in Erzincan. In 1985, Şahin graduated from Faculty of Law in Istanbul University.

Vasip Şahin is married, and is father of three.

Career
He began his civil servant career as a district governor candidate in Erzincan in June 1986. He was sent to the United Kingdom for further studies for one year in 1987.  Upon returning home, he served as district governor in Küre, Kastamonu, Pütürge, Malatya, Mudurnu, Bolu, Kızılcahamam, Ankara, and then as deputy province governor in Muş and Düzce.

In 2003, Şahin was appointed legal advisor at the Ministry of the Interior and department head at the General Directoriate of Civil Defence. He served as deputy general manager and later as general manager of the Provincial Administration between 2005 and 2010.

Vasip Şahin became province governor in Düzce in 2010 serving until 2012. His next post was governor of Malatya. On September 15, 2014, he was appointed governor of Istanbul Province. He took of on September 25.

References

1964 births
People from Bayburt
Istanbul University Faculty of Law alumni
Turkish civil servants
Governors of Istanbul
Living people